The Church of Scientology International, Inc. (CSI) is a California 501(c)(3) non-profit corporation. Within the worldwide network of Scientology corporations and entities, CSI is officially referred to as the "mother church" of the Church of Scientology.

The Church of Scientology International coordinates church growth, and attempts to preserve the uniformity of the teachings of Scientology's founder, L. Ron Hubbard. Golden Era Productions, a division of CSI, prints Scientology material, such as books, audio recordings of Hubbard's lectures, training films, and similar. Golden Era Productions also oversees the manufacture of E-meters.

In a 1993 memorandum by CSI, the following information was provided to the Internal Revenue Service with regards to CSI's role and functions, its personnel and its income:

[...] CSI [...] is the Mother Church of the Scientology religion, with ecclesiastical authority over the ministry of religious services to parishioners by all subordinate churches within the ecclesiastical hierarchy. This church has a staff of approximately 990 individuals and an annual budget of approximately $ 46.8 million, based on its annual disbursements for the most recent year for which financial statements are available. [...]"

Corporate information

Basic information

The Church of Scientology International (CSI) was incorporated on November 18, 1981, in Los Angeles, California by Richard Murray.

The official address of CSI is 6331 Hollywood Boulevard, Los Angeles 90028, in the Hollywood Guarantee Building. CSI also has offices at the Scientology complex in Gilman Hot Springs. Here the official address is 19625 Highway 79, Gilman Hot Springs 92383.

On September 21, 1993, the following individuals held corporate positions at CSI: The board of trustees was composed of Mark Rathbun, Ray Mithoff, Mark Ingber, Marc Yager and John Eastment. Jens Uhrskov, Michael Rinder and Guillaume Lesèvre formed the board of directors. At that time, the president of CSI was Heber Jentzsch, CSI's vice-president was Brian Anderson, its secretary Lynn Farny, its assistant secretary Leslie Browning and its treasurer Jonathan Epstein.

As of September 12, 1999 CSI's corporate officers were Heber Jentzsch as chief executive officer (president), Lynn Farny as secretary and Sarah Blythe as chief financial officer (treasurer).

As of March 24, 2008, CSI's official agent has been Jeanne M. Gavigan, 3055 Wilshire Boulevard, Suite 900, Los Angeles 90010.

On August 18, 1993, CSI filed an application for tax exemption under section 501(c)3) of the Internal Revenue Code and on September 3, 1993, a request for "group exemption" for the affiliated "Scientology churches"/"Class V organizations". In the same year, the Internal Revenue Service (IRS) eventually granted CSI's request for exemption.

The granting of tax exemption to CSI and other Scientology corporations was preceded by years of continuous litigation between the IRS and the various entities of Scientology. According to former high-ranking executives, the Scientology organization had launched about 200 lawsuits against the IRS until 1991. During the same time, individual parishioners of Scientology had initiated 2,300 claims against the agency, challenging the denial of tax deduction for their services at Scientology organizations. In 1991, the dispute over Scientology's tax-exempt status began to resolve through high-level meetings between David Miscavige and the then Commissioner of the IRS, Fred Goldberg, who encouraged a final resolution of the legal battle.

Main Corporate Activities – Licensing of Trademarks & Service Marks

Within the corporate structure of the Scientology network, the Religious Technology Center owns the right to license the Scientology trademarks and service marks through a so-called "assignment agreement" between RTC and the founder of Scientology, L. Ron Hubbard on May 16, 1982.

RTC and CSI entered a license agreement on May 18, 1982, granting CSI, the new "Mother Church of Scientology," the right to use and sub-license certain of the trademarks and service marks.

Additionally RTC and CSI signed on January 1, 1982, an "Organizational Covenant" granting CSI the right to deliver the "Advanced Technology" to its staff members.

CSI presents itself as the "mother church" of the "Scientology religion." In this function, it exercises through various agreements with its subordinate organizations worldwide ultimate corporative control over those organizations and their activities.

In particular, CSI has entered the following types of agreements with other organizations:
 License Agreements that regulate the use of the service marks and trademarks in a similar way as between RTC and the AOs. In its function as sub-licensor, CSI has entered such agreements for example with the Church of Scientology Flag Service Organization, Inc., Scientology Missions International or the Church of Scientology Western United States (prior "Church of Scientology of San Diego");
 Service Agreements regulate the training of the organizations employees by CSI in its headquarters and the monetary compensation by the organizations;
 "Ecclesiastical Support Agreements," which acknowledge CSI's dominant role and control over all the functions and activities of the subordinate organizations and which guarantee a steady, weekly payment of 12.5% of the organizations' net income towards CSI. The organization has entered such agreements for example with the Church of Scientology Flag Service Organization, Inc. and the Church of Scientology Western United States;
 "Contracts Respecting Certain Religious Documents." These contracts regulate the use of files that the organizations has on their members and their staff. Ultimately it gives CSI the authority to control the use of them;
 "Motion Picture Exhibition Agreements" guarantee CSI the weekly payment of 11% of the revenue by the individual organizations for their use of Scientology training courses. It also forces the organizations to use certain equipment, such as tape recorders, which CSI provides for the same use. CSI has entered such agreements for example with the Church of Scientology Flag Service Organization, Inc. and the Church of Scientology Western United States.

Organizational structure and management
CSI consists of a numerous corporations and unincorporated entities that are connected together by contracts and, more importantly, by the internal policies and the so-called "Scientology command channels", which define their activities.

Specifically CSI consists of the following principal organizations:
 The "Watchdog Committee" (WDC), an entity, is the highest management organization within CSI. Excluding RTC, it has the final say over all financial and personnel matters within the "Command Channels" of Scientology. In the "Command Channels" booklet its purpose is meagerly described as "establishing management units." WDC is headed by the WDC Chairman, who at the same time holds the position of "Commanding Officer" of the "Commodore's Messenger Organization International" (CMO Int.). The Commodore's Messenger Organization is an enforcement and internal investigation unit, which operates on behalf of the WDC. CMO International also comprises the office of the "Senior Case Supervisor International" (C/S Int.), a technical supervision unit, the "LRH Personal Public Relations Office International" (LRH PPRO) and the "International Finance Office", an office that supervises through its "Finance network" all financial matters of the various organizations.
 Golden Era Productions is another CSI-entity that is located at Gilman Hot Springs. It is the organization that is responsible for the production of Scientology films, audiotapes and E-meters and conducts worldwide marketing campaigns for Dianetics and Scientology.
 The "International Network of Computer Organized Management" (INCOMM) hosts the internal communications system and computer data banks. It safeguards all reports that are received by the Scientology management from the other organizations, as stated by CSI in an exhibit of CSI's application for tax-exempt status.
 The "Senior Executive Strata," stands below the WDC. It is composed of the "International Management Executive Committee" (IMEC) and its staff. IMEC is considered as the strategic management unit within CSI, which does the planning, evaluation and the long-term management of Scientology organizations worldwide, as described in the "Command Channels"-booklet. IMEC is led by the "Executive Director International".
 The next lower management unit is the "Flag Command Bureaux" (FCB). FCB includes various sub-entities, management units, networks and corporations. Among them are:
 The supervising authority "Flag Network Coordination Committee" (FNCC). This entity is composed of the heads of the different management units within the FCB under the guidance of the "Commanding Officer FCB." The FNCC supposedly meets on a daily basis and coordinates the activities of the networks within the FCB.
 The "LRH Communicator Network" (LRH Comm.). It is an internal investigation unit, that manages 3 other networks, designed for the "preservation and application of standard tech and admin(istration)" within the lower organizations of the Scientology network.
 The "Finance Network" (a lower extension of the International Finance Network), which micromanages the finances of the local and regional Scientology organizations.
 The Office of Special Affairs International (OSA Int.). It is the unit, which supervises and controls the Office of Special Affairs network. This unit manages and controls the legal and intelligence operations of the Church of Scientology on a worldwide basis.
 The "Flag Bureaux" (FB). This is the entity that directly manages the Church of Scientology Flag Service Organization, Inc. (FSO) in Clearwater, the Church of Scientology Flag Ship Service Organization (FSSO) in Netherlands Antilles, the Celebrity Centre International (CC Int.) in Los Angeles, the organization "I HELP," which licenses "Field Auditors" and the "Flag Liaison Offices" (FLOs), "continental" management units that direct the lower organizations and missions on their specific "Scientology-continent."
 The organization Scientology Missions International (SMI). This is a Californian non-profit corporation, which controls and directs the "continental" SMI-offices and licenses the individual "Missions," smaller or "beginner" organizations of the Scientology-network.
 World Institute of Scientology Enterprises International (WISE Int.), a Californian non-profit corporation, which controls and directs the "continental" WISE-offices and licenses independent Scientology businesses that use and sell the "LRH administrative technology."
 The Association for Better Living and Education International (ABLE Int.), a Californian non-profit corporation, which controls and directs the "continental" ABLE-offices and directs two other non-profit corporations Narconon International and Applied Scholastics International. The latter two are organizations, which propagate Scientology's anti-drug and literacy programs.
 Bridge Publications, Inc. (BPI), a non-profit corporation from Los Angeles, California, which is Scientology's publication's organization. It is marketing Scientology books and magazines within the United States and Canada.
 "New Era Publications International ApS" (New Era), a for-profit corporation from Copenhagen, Denmark, which operates through numerous affiliated organizations in countries that are not covered by BPI's operations. These are mostly non-English speaking countries.

See also
 Scientology controversies
 Scientology
 Dianetics
 Church of Scientology
 Religious Technology Center
 Church of Spiritual Technology
 Church of Scientology Flag Service Organization, Inc.
 Church of Scientology Western United States
 Scientology Missions International
 List of Scientology organizations

References

External links
 The Church of Scientology International, official description at Scientology.org

Scientology organizations
Charities based in California
Religious organizations established in 1981
Organizations based in Los Angeles